The Popkum First Nation or Popkum Band is a band government of the Sto:lo people located in the Upper Fraser Valley region, at Popkum, northeast of Chilliwack, British Columbia, Canada.  They are a member government of the Sto:lo Nation tribal council.

References

Sto:lo governments
First Nations governments in the Lower Mainland